Gol may refer to:

Places

 Gol, Gilan, a village in Gilan Province, Iran
 Gol, South Khorasan, a village in South Khorasan Province, Iran
 Gol, Bukan, a village in West Azerbaijan Province, Iran
 Gol, Chaldoran, a village in West Azerbaijan Province, Iran
 Gol, Naqadeh, a village in West Azerbaijan Province, Iran
 Gol, Norway, a municipality in Buskerud
 Göl, Vezirköprü, a municipality in Samsun Province, Turkey
 Gol, Bhopal, a village in Madhya Pradesh, India
 Gol is the Mongolian word for "river", and part of many river names, e.g. Khalkhyn Gol, Edsin Gol, Tamir gol,...

People with the surname
 Janusz Gol (born 1985), Polish footballer
 Jean Gol (1942-1995), Belgian politician

Other uses
 GOL Sniper Magnum, a German sniper rifle
 GOL Intelligent Airlines, a Brazilian airline company
 GOL PLAY, a Spanish TV channel dedicated to football (soccer)
 GOL TV, the first television network in the United States dedicated to soccer 
 Conway's Game of Life
 Gods of Luxury, also known as G.O.L., a Swedish 1995 expressionistic electronica music project
 Gola language of Liberia
 Gold Beach Municipal Airport, Gold Beach, Oregon
 Golspie railway station, Scotland; National Rail station code GOL
 Volkswagen Gol, a car made by Volkswagen do Brasil
 Gol Acheron, a character in the Jak and Daxter video-game series
 Gol or Gul (design), an octagonal motif in oriental carpets and kilims

See also
 N'gol or Land diving
 Gol Gol (disambiguation)
 Goal (disambiguation)
 Gole (disambiguation)